This Desert is the debut extended play (EP) by American electronic music duo The Hundred in the Hands. It was released on May 17, 2010 by Warp. In an interview with Spinner, band member Jason Friedman said, "As we finished the EP and album, we saw that we had two different sounds. The EP is more washed-out with reverb and delays, and the album is crisper and more immediate, like 'Dresden.'" Two songs from the EP, "Tom Tom" and "Sleepwalkers", were included as bonus tracks on the iTunes edition of the duo's eponymous debut album.

Track listing

Personnel
Credits adapted from the liner notes of This Desert.

The Hundred in the Hands
 The Hundred in the Hands – production ; engineering ; additional engineering 
 Eleanore Everdell – vocals, keyboards, synthesizer
 Jason Friedman – bass, beats production, guitar, programming

Additional personnel
 Alex Aldi – engineering ; assistant engineering 
 Eric Broucek – additional engineering ; additional programming ; mixing ; engineering, production 
 William Kuehn – live drums 
 Keith McColl – executive producer
 Jacques Renault – additional programming, production 
 Vito Roccoforte – live drums 
 Noel Summerville – mastering
 Chris Zane – engineering ; additional engineering, mixing

References

2010 debut EPs
The Hundred in the Hands albums
Warp (record label) EPs